No Music Day (November 21) is an event introduced by Bill Drummond to draw attention to the cheapening of music as an art form due to its mindless and ubiquitous use in contemporary society.  Drummond explained "I decided I needed a day I could set aside to listen to no music whatsoever, [...] Instead, I would be thinking about what I wanted and what I didn't want from music. Not to blindly – or should that be deafly – consume what was on offer. A day where I could develop ideas."

The date of November 21 was chosen as it is the day before the feast of Saint Cecilia, who is the patron saint of music.  This follows the traditional observance of antithetical events on the day before religious occasions, such as celebrating Mardi Gras before the start of Lent.

No Music Day 2005–09
While No Music Day is on November 21 every year it was most actively called attention to by Bill Drummond and various organisations from 2005 to 2009 (Drummond called it a five-year plan).
It was launched in 2005 with a billboard poster at the entrance to the Mersey Tunnel, Liverpool. In 2006, the arts based radio station Resonance 104fm broadcast no music, as did BBC Radio Scotland in 2007. No Music Day was promoted in São Paulo, Brazil in 2008, although Drummond has stated that despite graffiti announcing the day, his efforts to apprehend buskers and to encourage music shops to close, he doubted that "there was even a fraction less music consumed in Brazil on the 21 November 2008 compared to any other day."
In turn, in 2009 the City of Linz, Austria quite comprehensively observed No Music Day with the backing of the mayor and the Hörstadt ("Acoustic City") initiative. Shops, restaurants, schools and radio stations in Linz played no music, the cinemas showed only films without music soundtracks and theatres and concert halls held only non-musical performances.

References

External links
Silence is Golden – or for at least one day of the year it is Bill Drummond's manifesto No music day The Guardian Sunday October 15, 2006
How No Music Day struck a chord BBC  November 21, 2007
Who’ll Stop the Ring Tones? New York Times November 18, 2007
No iPod, Radio or Humming on 'No Music Day' NPR All things considered, Melissa Block interviews Drummond.
A little music goes a long way Thomas Sutcliffe in The Independent November 23, 2007.
 Bill Drummond Interview – No Music Day Has Been And Gone, The Quietus, November 23, 2009.

Music festivals staged internationally
November observances
Music festivals established in 2005